Within signal processing, in many cases only one image with noise is available, and averaging is then realized in a local neighbourhood. Results are acceptable if the noise is smaller in size than the smallest objects of interest in the image, but blurring of edges is a serious disadvantage. In the case of smoothing within a single image, one has to assume that there are no changes in the gray levels of the underlying image data. This assumption is clearly violated at locations of image edges, and edge blurring is a direct consequence of violating the assumption.

Description

Averaging is a special case of discrete convolution. For a 3 by 3 neighbourhood, the convolution mask M is:

 
The significance of the central pixel may be increased, as it approximates the properties of noise with a Gaussian probability distribution:

A suitable page for beginners about matrices is at:
https://web.archive.org/web/20060819141930/http://www.gamedev.net/reference/programming/features/imageproc/page2.asp

The whole article starts on page: https://web.archive.org/web/20061019072001/http://www.gamedev.net/reference/programming/features/imageproc/

References

Signal processing
Noise (graphics)
Radio technology